Justin Gimelstob and Scott Humphries were the defending champions but did not compete that year.

Julien Boutter and Dominik Hrbatý won in the final 6–4, 3–6, [13–11] against Marius Barnard and Jim Thomas.

Seeds
Champion seeds are indicated in bold text while text in italics indicates the round in which those seeds were eliminated.

Draw

Finals

References

ATP Tashkent Open
2001 ATP Tour